Nemanja Kostić (born 23 April 2004) is a Serbian footballer who currently plays as a goalkeeper for Radnik Surdulica.

Career statistics

Club

Notes

References

2004 births
Living people
Serbian footballers
Association football goalkeepers
Serbian SuperLiga players
FK Radnik Surdulica players